Parliamentary elections were held in Bolivia in May 1923 to elect half the seats of the Chamber Deputies and one-third of the Senate.

Results

Elected members
The new senators were:
José Cronenbold, PR (Santa Cruz)
Felipe Guzmán, PR (La Paz)
Hernando Siles, PR (Chuquisaca)
Manuel Mogro Moreno, PR (Tarija)
José Paravicini, PR (Potosí)

References

Elections in Bolivia
Bolivia
Legislative election
Election and referendum articles with incomplete results